Erik Nilsson (born 30 July 1989) is a Swedish footballer who most recently played for IK Brage in Superettan as a midfielder.

Career

IK Brage
Nilsson left IK Brage after the 2018 season. This was announced on 16 November 2018.

References

External links

1989 births
Living people
Association football midfielders
Örebro SK players
Ljungskile SK players
Degerfors IF players
IK Brage players
Allsvenskan players
Superettan players
Swedish footballers